Colonial First State (CFS), is an Australian wealth management group  that provides investment, superannuation and retirement products to individuals and corporate and superannuation fund investors.

History
The company was established in 1988 when the State Bank of New South Wales created First State Fund Management as a subsidiary. In 1994, Colonial Mutual acquired the State Bank of New South Wales from the NSW Government, and on 23 September 1996 the merged entity was rebranded as Colonial State Bank, with First State Fund Management being branded as "Colonial First State" (CFS). CFS demutualised in 1997 and in 2000, it was acquired by the Commonwealth Bank, with the Colonial State Bank division being merged into the Commonwealth Bank.

In May 2020, owner Commonwealth Bank announced that, subject to gaining approval from the Australian Prudential Regulation Authority and Foreign Investment Review Board, it would sell a 55% interest in the business to KKR. The transaction was completed in November 2021. On 1 December 2021, CFS became a standalone company.

CFS announced its commitment on climate change, aligning CFS to the goals of the Paris Agreement and committing to net zero emissions by 2050 and to a 30 per cent reduction in Greenhouse Gas emissions from 2019 levels for its investment portfolios.

References

External links
Company website

Commonwealth Bank
Financial services companies based in Sydney
Investment companies of Australia
Kohlberg Kravis Roberts companies